A  is a living street, as originally implemented in the Netherlands and in Flanders (Belgium). Techniques include shared space, traffic calming, and low speed limits. 

The term  has been adopted directly by some English-language publications. In the United Kingdom, these areas are called home zones.

Etymology

History

Since the invention of automobiles, cities have been predominantly constructed to accommodate the use of automobiles.

In 1999 the Netherlands had over 6000  and today around 2 million Dutch people are living in woonerven.

In 2006 it was reported that people in Hesselterbrink, a neighborhood of Emmen, were disillusioned about how the  principle had become another traffic engineering measure that "entailed precious little more than signs and uniform standards". They are reported to "now know that car drivers should become residents. Eye contact and human interaction are more effective means to achieve and maintain attractive and safe areas than signs and rules".

Regulation

Belgium 

The  has a residential focus; the erf can have other primary uses like “crafts, trade, tourism, education and recreation”.

In art. 22bis, the Belgian traffic regulation describes what is and what isn’t allowed in a (woon)erf:

Netherlands 

Notes

Further reading

 (about a Batavia, Illinois)

External links 
Case Studies: Woonerf at California Active Transportation Safety Information Pages (UC Berkeley)
What in the World is a Woonerf? (Canin Associates)

Living streets
Types of streets
Types of roads
Cycling infrastructure in the Netherlands
Transportation planning
Pedestrian streets in the Netherlands
Traffic calming